The  is a rapid transit electric multiple unit (EMU) operated by the Transportation Bureau City of Nagoya on the Nagoya Subway Kamiiida Line and inter-running services through to the Meitetsu Komaki Line in Japan since 2003. They operate alongside the Meitetsu 300 series EMUs.

Formation
The trainsets are formed as follows. (Left is toward Heian-dōri Station and right is toward Inuyama Station)

The M1 and M2 cars are each fitted with one single-arm pantograph.

History
The first trains entered service on 27 March 2003.

References

External links

 Nagoya Transportation Bureau information 
 Nippon Sharyo information 

Electric multiple units of Japan
7000 series
Train-related introductions in 2003
Nippon Sharyo multiple units
1500 V DC multiple units of Japan